Michael Thiago Barbosa de Araujo (born October 31, 1984 in Recife), known as just Thiago Maikel, is a retired Brazilian football player.

References 

HLSZ

1984 births
Living people
Brazilian footballers
Brazilian expatriate footballers
Szombathelyi Haladás footballers
C.D. Feirense players
CD Guijuelo footballers
US Sandweiler players
Expatriate footballers in Hungary
Expatriate footballers in Portugal
Expatriate footballers in Spain
Expatriate footballers in Luxembourg
Brazilian expatriate sportspeople in Hungary
Brazilian expatriate sportspeople in Portugal
Brazilian expatriate sportspeople in Spain
Brazilian expatriate sportspeople in Luxembourg
Association football midfielders
Sportspeople from Recife